The 6th Independent Spirit Awards, honoring the best in independent filmmaking for 1990, were announced on March 23, 1991 at the Beverly Hilton Hotel in Los Angeles. It was hosted by Buck Henry.

Winners and nominees

Films with multiple nominations and awards

Films that received multiple nominations

Films that won multiple awards

Special awards

Friend of Independents Award
Eastman Kodak Co.
Sovereign Pictures, Inc.

John Cassavetes Award
Jon Jost
Edward R. Pressman

Special Distinction Award
Kevin Costner and Jim Wilson – Dances with Wolves

References

External links
Full ceremony on YouTube
1990 Spirit Awards at IMDb

1990
Independent Spirit Awards